Purpuradusta gracilis is a species of sea snail, a cowry, a marine gastropod mollusk in the family Cypraeidae, the cowries.

Subspecies
 Purpuradusta gracilis gracilis (Gaskoin, J.S., 1849)    
 forma : Purpuradusta gracilis gracilis japonica (f) Schilder, F.A., 1931 
 Purpuradusta gracilis jamila Lorenz, 1998
 Purpuradusta gracilis macula  (Angas, G.F., 1867 
 forma : Purpuradusta gracilis macula hilda (f) Iredale, T., 1939  
 Purpuradusta gracilis nemethi Van Heesvelde, J., 2010 
 Purpuradusta gracilis notata (Gill, 1858) 
 forma : Purpuradusta gracilis notata jamila (f)  Lorenz, F. Jr. & A. Hubert, 1993

Description
The length of the shell attains 14.9 mm.

Distribution
This species is distributed in the European waters and in the Indian Ocean along Aldabra, Chagos, Kenya, the Mascarene Basin, Mauritius, Réunion, the Seychelles, Somalia and Tanzania.

References

Notes
 Burgess, C.M. (1970). The Living Cowries. AS Barnes and Co, Ltd. Cranbury, New Jersey
 Gofas, S.; Le Renard, J.; Bouchet, P. (2001). Mollusca, in: Costello, M.J. et al. (Ed.) (2001). European register of marine species: a check-list of the marine species in Europe and a bibliography of guides to their identification. Collection Patrimoines Naturels, 50: pp. 180–213
 Knudsen J. (1994).Further observations on the egg capsules and reproduction of some marine prosobranch molluscs from Hong Kong. . In: Morton B, editor. Proceedings of the Third International workshop on the malacofauna of Hong Kong and Southern China. The malacofauna of Hong Kong and southern China III. Hong Kong University Press, Hong Kong. pp 283-306.
Range extension of the Lessepsian Cypraeidae Purpuradusta gracilis (Gaskoin, 1849) and Erronea caurica (Linnaeus, 1758), with description of a new subspecies of Purpuradusta gracilis. Visaya 3(1): 4-15

External links
 Gaskoin J.S. (1849 ("1848") ). Description of new species of the genus Cypraea. Proceedings of the Zoological Society of London. 16: 90-98.]

Cypraeidae
Gastropods described in 1849